The Boys' Herald (subtitled: A Healthy Paper for Manly Boys) was a boy's story paper published by Amalgamated Press in England from 1903. It was a companion paper to The Boys' Friend and The Boys' Realm. It mostly ran adventure stories and sold for 1d.  It ceased publication in 1913.

All three of the papers were served by the same writers: Sidney Drew, Maxwell Scott, Herbert Maxwell, S. Clark Hook, T.C. Bridges, Reginald Way, Henry Johnson, Alec G. Pearson, Henry St. Jon, John Tregellis, John Hunter, William Murray Graydon, Robert Leighton and Arthur S. Hardy.

References

External links
 Magazine Data File
 Issues of The Boys' Herald at the Friardale Website
 The Boys' Herald list of issues at The FictionMags Index

British boys' story papers
Children's magazines published in the United Kingdom
Defunct magazines published in the United Kingdom
Magazines established in 1903
Magazines disestablished in 1913
Publications of Sexton Blake